
Madatapa Lake is a lake in the Samtskhe-Javakheti region of southeastern Georgia, near the border with Armenia, north of Bavra. It is found in one of the most earthquake-prone areas of the Caucasus. A shallow lake, it, along with Khanchali Lake, is one of the most important in the country for breeding and staging waterbirds, including the endangered Dalmatian pelican. Since 2020 it has been designated as a protected Ramsar site.

The villages of Zhdanovakani, Epremovka, Troitskoye and Sameba lie around the lake. Biketi Lake lies to the north.

See also 
Madatapa Managed Reserve
Javakheti Plateau

References

Lakes of Georgia (country)
Ramsar sites in Georgia (country)
Geography of Samtskhe–Javakheti